Oxynoticeratidae is a family of true ammonites  (order Ammonitida) included in the superfamily Psiloceratoidea.

Oxynoticeratids have a broad, worldwide distribution but a narrow stratigraphic one, being known only from the Upper Sinemurian and Lower Pliensbachian, during which their shells changed little in form.

Genera
Cheltonia Buckman, 1904
Gleviceras Buckman, 1918
Hypoxynoticeras Spath, 1925
Oxynoticeras Hyatt, 1875
Paracymbites Spath, 1925
Paroxynoticeras Pia, 1914
Radstockiceras Buckman, 1918
Slatterites Spath, 1923

Description
These cephalopds, as the other species in the superfamily Psiloceratoidea, are usually characterized by mostly involute, oxyconic shells with narrow venter and compressed, lanceolate whorl section. The suture line is of ammonitic type. Ribbing is feeble, hardly functional and often absent.

They have developed shorter body chambers than in the ancestral Arietitidae, resulting in more stable floating positions. Their mostly smooth, knife-edge discoidal forms would have allowed for quick, though probably no sustained, movement through the water.

Distribution
Fossils of species within this genus have been found in the Jurassic sediments of Argentina, Canada, China, France, Hungary, Italy, Mexico, Morocco, Spain, Turkey and United Kingdom.

References

 Arkell et al., 1957. Mesozoic Ammonoidea. Treatise on Invertebrate Paleontology, Part L, pp. L240-L243. Geological Soc. of America and Univ. Kansas Press.
 Donovan & Callomon, 1981. Ammonoidea. 

 
Ammonitida families
Sinemurian first appearances
Early Jurassic extinctions